Marcello Edward Dennis Sampson (born 27 March 1987) is a South African professional rugby union player, who most recently played as a winger with .

Career

Youth and Varsity Rugby

Western Province
He was named in the  senior squad for the 2009 Vodacom Cup, but was never included in a matchday squad.

Eastern Province Kings
He made six starts in total, scoring two tries.

His Currie Cup debut came in the EP Kings' opening day match in the 2011 Currie Cup First Division against . He had his most prolific season in Kings colours, scoring nine tries in just seven starts, to finish joint fifth in the try scoring charts for the competition.

He made nineteen starts during 2012, weighing in with a further eight tries. However, he announced towards the end of the season that he would be leaving the Port Elizabeth-based team.

2013 Southern Kings Super Rugby season
In 2013, he was also named in the  squad for the 2013 Super Rugby season. He started eleven of the Kings' games and came on off the bench in another two matches. However, he failed to score any tries during the regular season.

Pumas
He was a member of the Pumas side that won the Vodacom Cup for the first time in 2015, beating  24–7 in the final. Sampson made six appearances during the season, scoring three tries.

References

South African rugby union players
Eastern Province Elephants players
Southern Kings players
Living people
1987 births
Pumas (Currie Cup) players
Alumni of Wynberg Boys' High School
Rugby union wings
Rugby union players from Cape Town